The discography of Butch Vig, an American musician and record producer, consists of a mix of albums, extended plays and singles released by bands he was a performer in and records on which he produced, mixed, remixed, engineered or a combination of those roles.

After graduating from the University of Wisconsin with a degree in film studies, Vig became a core member of cult Mid-West band Spooner, and an offshoot group Fire Town, as well as co-founding recording studio Smart Studios in Madison, Wisconsin in the Eighties. Vig is now best known internationally as the drummer of the Madison-based alternative rock band Garbage and the producer of multi-platinum selling albums Nevermind by Nirvana and Siamese Dream by The Smashing Pumpkins.

Vig's production, Green Day's 21st Century Breakdown, debuted at #1 on the Billboard 200 and atop the album charts of 23 further countries.

Performer

Vig also wrote and recorded the theme tune for the Green Bay Packers, "Go Pack Go!", under the band name The 6 Packers.

Music production

Production

The following studio albums were produced, or co-produced by Vig, many at his own recording studio:

 A Co-produced by Butch Vig and Steve Marker.
 B Co-produced by Butch Vig and Corey Rusk. 
 C Co-produced by Butch Vig and Billy Corgan. 
 D Co-produced by Butch Vig and Jerry Finn.
 E Co-produced by Butch Vig and Steve Watson. 

The following individual tracks were produced by Vig for various projects:

Mixing

 A Mixed credited to Vig, independent of Garbage.

Remixes

Notes:
All remixes are credited to Butch Vig, except  A credited to Butch Vig and Danny Saber and  B credited to Butch Vig and Doug Erikson.  C remixed by Butch Vig, independent of Garbage.
 D This remix has never been commercially released, however elements from the remix were incorporated into "Throw This Away". It was found in the early '90s on an FTP server as an 8-bit/22,050 Hz AIFF file, and then circulated on P2P until Trent Reznor hosted a WAV file of the remix online.

References

External links
 Official Website Garbage

Discographies of American artists
Production discographies